Alexis Weisheim (born 15 January 1981 in Entre Ríos Province) is an Argentine footballer who is playing for Club Sanjustino de San Justo.

Biography

Personal life 
Weisheim suffers from diabetes.

In 2006, he signed for Israeli side Hapoel Kfar Saba.

His last spell in Israel was with M.S. Givat Olga, where he was released in June 2012.
He later returned to Argentina, and continues to play there in lower level leagues, currently with Club Sanjustino de San Justo.

Statistics

Footnotes

External links
 Profile and statistics of Alexis Weisheim on One.co.il 
 Alexis Weisheim at BDFA.com.ar 

1981 births
Living people
Argentine Jews
Jewish Argentine sportspeople
Sportspeople from Entre Ríos Province
Argentine footballers
Unión de Santa Fe footballers
Hapoel Kfar Saba F.C. players
Hapoel Haifa F.C. players
Maccabi Ironi Tirat HaCarmel F.C. players
Hapoel Acre F.C. players
Maccabi Kafr Kanna F.C. players
Hapoel F.C. Karmiel Safed players
F.C. Givat Olga players
Liga Leumit players
Israeli Premier League players
Argentine emigrants to Israel
Association football forwards